Eduardo Antonio Pinto Pinto (born January 5, 1976 in Talca, Chile) is a Chilean former footballer who played as a midfielder.

Teams (Player)
  Rangers 1994-2001
  Coquimbo Unido 2002
  Unión San Felipe 2003
  Rangers 2004-2009
  Curicó Unido 2010–2012

Teams (Manager)
  Rangers (youth)
  Rangers (caretaker) 2022–

Titles
  Rangers 1997 (Torneo Apertura Primera B Championship)

References

External links
 
 

1976 births
Living people
People from Talca
Chilean footballers
Chilean Primera División players
Primera B de Chile players
Rangers de Talca footballers
Coquimbo Unido footballers
Unión San Felipe footballers
Curicó Unido footballers
Association football midfielders
Chilean football managers
Rangers de Talca managers
Primera B de Chile managers